Roberto Insigne (born 11 May 1994) is an Italian professional footballer who plays as a forward for  club Frosinone. He is also the younger brother of Italy international Lorenzo Insigne.

Club career

Napoli
Insigne initially chose the shirt number 42 at Napoli, as his older brother and Napoli teammate Lorenzo wore the number 24, but later chose the number 30, and finally the number 94, as it represented the year of his birth. After playing for the Napoli Primavera side in the club's youth system, he made his professional debut for the club's senior side under manager Walter Mazzarri in the Europa League on 6 December 2012, in a 2–0 home defeat against PSV Eindhoven; his first appearance in Serie A came on 13 January 2013, as he appeared as a very late substitute in a 3–0 home win against Palermo, playing alongside his older brother.

On 22 July 2013 he was sent on loan from Napoli to Perugia, at the request of the club's coach, and former Napoli striker, Cristiano Lucarelli.

In August 2014, he was sent on loan from Napoli to Reggina.

On 15 July 2015, both Insigne and his young Napoli attacking teammate Gennaro Tutino were sent on loan to Avellino with an option to buy.

On 12 January 2017, Insigne was sent on loan from Napoli to Serie B side Latina, where he was assigned the number 9 shirt.

On 23 July 2017, it was announced that Insigne would be loaned to newly promoted Serie B side Parma for the 2017–18 season.

Benevento
On 21 July 2018, Insigne joined with Serie B side Benevento on loan until 30 June 2019. On 23 June 2019, Insigne signed permanently with Benevento. On 29 June 2020, Insigne helped Benevento secure promotion to the Serie A with seven matches to spare. At the time, Benevento had won 23 of their 31 league games and lost just once, and had a 24-point advantage over nearest rivals Crotone and Cittadella.

On 25 October 2020, Insigne scored in Benenvento's clash with his former club Napoli; Insigne's brother Lorenzo was also on the scoresheet as Napoli won 2–1. It was Insigne's first goal ever in the top division of Italian football. It was also only the second time in Serie A history that two brothers have scored against each other in a game; Hungarian pair István and Ferenc Nyers did the same back in 1949, while playing for Inter Milan and Lazio respectively.

Frosinone
On 27 August 2022, Insigne signed a two-year contract with Frosinone.

International career
At international level, Insigne has represented the Italy U-18, U-19, and U-21 sides.

Style of play
Regarded as a talented and promising prospect, Insigne is a diminutive, quick, creative, and skilful left footed forward, with good technique, an eye for goal, and a small, slender physical build, who is capable of playing anywhere along the front line. Due to his ability to both set up and score goals, he usually plays in a free role as a second striker, which allows him to operate on either flank or in the centre of the attacking third, although he frequently also plays as a right winger, a position which allows him to cut into the centre and curl shots on goal with his stronger left foot. He has also been deployed as an attacking midfielder, or as a main striker on occasion.

Career statistics

Club

Honours
Perugia
Lega Pro: 2013–14

Benevento
Serie B: 2019–20

Personal life
Roberto is the younger brother of footballer Lorenzo Insigne, who plays for Toronto FC. His oldest and youngest brothers, Antonio and Marco, also play football, in the Italian amateur divisions. Roberto Insigne is married to Elisabetta; their daughter, Patrizia, was born on 22 November 2016.

References

External links
 
 Roberto Insigne FIGC Profile

1994 births
Living people
Sportspeople from the Province of Naples
Italian footballers
Italy youth international footballers
Association football forwards
S.S.C. Napoli players
A.C. Perugia Calcio players
Reggina 1914 players
U.S. Avellino 1912 players
Latina Calcio 1932 players
Parma Calcio 1913 players
Benevento Calcio players
Frosinone Calcio players
Serie A players
Serie B players
Serie C players
Footballers from Campania